John Hendrix may refer to:
 John W. Hendrix, United States Army general
 John Shannon Hendrix, architectural historian and philosopher

See also
 John Hendricks (disambiguation)